The John Wright Mansion is a historic farmhouse located east of Bellevue in northwestern Huron County, Ohio, United States.  Built in 1881, it represents an unusual combination of location and architectural styles.

A native of England, John Wright settled in the United States in 1833, moving quickly to Huron County. Besides buying land, he was prominent for his military service as a four-year veteran of the United States Army during the Civil War.

When Wright decided to build the present house, he chose to employ the Second Empire style of architecture.  This combination was quite unusual: Second Empire houses are found far more often in urban settings, and massive residences of the style are very rare on farmsteads in the region.  Built of brick, this three-story house is topped with a mansard roof and prominent dormers; the front is symmetrical and ornamented with a bracketed porch in the Italianate style.  Toward the rear, a wing as tall as the rest of the house extends southward; the interior is composed of a substantial ballroom and twenty-three other rooms.

In early 1974, the Wright Mansion was listed on the National Register of Historic Places, qualifying because of its distinctive historic architecture.  Today, the mansion is part of Historic Lime Village, a volunteer-based organization that operates it as a historic house museum.

References

External links
Historic Lyme Village

Houses completed in 1881
Historic house museums in Ohio
Museums in Huron County, Ohio
National Register of Historic Places in Huron County, Ohio
Houses on the National Register of Historic Places in Ohio
Second Empire architecture in Ohio
Houses in Huron County, Ohio
1881 establishments in Ohio